The Leptomantellidae are a new (2019), small family of praying mantids, based on the type genus Leptomantella.  As part of a major revision of mantid taxonomy, genera have been moved here from the Caliridinae in the now obsolete family Tarachodidae.

The new placement is in superfamily Nanomantoidea (of group Cernomantodea) and infraorder Schizomantodea.  Species in this family have been recorded from Asia, including India and Indochina.

Genera 
The Mantodea Species File lists:
 Aetaella Hebard, 1920
 Hebardia - monotypic H. pellucida Werner, 1921
 Hebardiella Werner, 1924
 Leptomantella Uvarov, 1940

References

External links 

Mantodea families